Andreas Harrysson (born 3 June 1975) is a professional Swedish darts player, who currently plays mainly in World Darts Federation events.

Career
In 2016, Harrysson became the Scandinavian singles champion for the first time. He defended this in 2018. He also won the team competition with Sweden in 2016.

Also in 2016, Andreas Harrysson played his first 2016 WDF Europe Cup reaching the semifinal before losing out to Wales player Jim Williams

In 2017, Andreas became the Swedish champion for the first time. Harrysson then defended the title in 2018 before adding a third consecutive title in 2019. Joining the likes of Stefan Lord and Magnus Caris to win it three times.

In 2018, Harrysson won the Finnish Masters and WDF Europe Cup Team. In September 2019, he qualified for the 2020 BDO World Darts Championship as the Baltic & Scandinavian Qualifier.

In 2020, Harrysson made his first-ever appearance on television. Competing in the 2020 BDO World Darts Championship live on Eurosport winning his preliminary round game 3–2 in sets against the current One80 L-style World Masters champion John O'Shea before losing out to number one seed Wesley Harms 2–3 in sets.

Harrysson made his PDC debut in October 2020 at the 2020 International Darts Open, after qualifying via the Nordic & Baltic qualifier. He made it to a second round game after beating Benito van de Pas before losing out to world number eight James Wade.

World Championship results

BDO/WDF
 2020: First round (lost to Wesley Harms 2–3) (sets)
 2022: First round (lost to László Kádár 1–2)

References

External links
 

Living people
Swedish darts players
Professional Darts Corporation associate players
1975 births